The simple station Venecia is part of the TransMilenio mass-transit system of Bogotá, Colombia, opened in the year 2000.

Location

The station is located in southern Bogotá, specifically on Autopista Sur with Carrera 54A.

It serves the Venecia and Fatima neighborhoods.

History

This station was opened April 15, 2006 as part of the section between the stations General Santander and Portal del Sur of the NQS line.

The station is named Venecia due to the neighborhood of the same name that lies to the south.

Station Services

Old trunk services

Main line service

Feeder routes

This station does not have connections to feeder routes.

Inter-city service

This station does not have inter-city service.

External links
 Opening of the line from eltiempo.com
 Problemas en la inauguración de la troncal Autopista Sur en eltiempo.com

See also 
Bogotá
TransMilenio
List of TransMilenio stations

TransMilenio